The 2011 Australian Carrera Cup Championship was a CAMS sanctioned motor racing title for drivers of Porsche 911 GT3 Cup cars. The championship, which was contested over seven rounds across four states, began on 24 March 2011 at the Australian Grand Prix and ended on 4 December at the Sydney 500. It was the seventh Australian Carrera Cup Championship.

After the opening round of the series, reigning champion Craig Baird led the championship having scored a second and two wins over the course of the 2011 Australian Grand Prix weekend. Baird was thirty points ahead of Daniel Gaunt and Steven Richards. The winner of the opening race of the season, Jonny Reid slipped to sixth place in the points after a disappointing race when the car slowed on the final lap of the race. An all-podium performance at the second round of the championship by Richards elevated him into the points lead while Reid began a run of six consecutive races of top two race positions to take the championship lead after the third round, a round which had been dominated by Daniel Gaunt with three wins at the Townsville 400 weekend.

New Zealand driver Jonny Reid led the series after three rounds with a narrow four point gap over countryman Craig Baird. Steven Richards sat 41 points behind Reid who in turn was just two point ahead of Daniel Gaunt. Reid had won three races over the season thus far, as had Gaunt with Baird having won twice and Richards once.

Teams and drivers
The following teams and drivers contested the championship.

Race calendar

Each of the seven rounds was contested over three races.

Points system
Championship points were awarded on a 60–54–48–42–36–32–29–26–23–20–18–16–14–12–11–10–9–8–7–6–5–4–3–2–1 basis to the first twenty-five finishers in each race.

Results and standings

Drivers' championship

Professional Class
The Professional Class was won by Craig Baird from Jonny Reid and Daniel Gaunt.

Elite Class
The Elite Class was won by Max Twigg from Paul Kelly and James Koundouris.

See also
 Australian Carrera Cup Championship
 Porsche Supercup
 Porsche 911 GT3
 Porsche 997

References

Australian Carrera Cup Championship seasons
Carrera Cup Championship